Arti sacrum (Latin for "sacred art") is a Dutch artists' society located in Rotterdam, Netherlands.

Members
Petrus van Schendel
Jan van Ravenswaay

Dutch artist groups and collectives
Organisations based in Rotterdam